John Edward Phelan (November 6, 1925 – March 20, 2021) was an American basketball player who was a forward in the National Basketball Association. He played with the Waterloo Hawks and Sheboygan Red Skins during the 1949-50 NBA season.

Career 
Phelan played for the DePaul University Blue Demons from 1943 to 1945, playing on the 1945 NIT Championship team before enlisting in the Navy.  He returned to the team from 1947 to 1949, playing forward and back-up center to the man voted the best basketball player of 1900–1950, George Mikan.  Mikan had a scar on his elbow made by teeth he knocked out of Jack's mouth in a practice the day they left for the NIT Tournament.  Jack played part-time from 1951 to 1955 as a fill-in player against the Harlem Globetrotters. They were variously billed as the Chicago Majors, the Philadelphia Sphas, the Boston Whirlwinds, the KC Monarchs, and the House of David, among other names.

Phelan went on to a career as a salesman and manager with the Nalco Chemical Company.  He then settled in Bradenton, Florida, where he died on March 20, 2021.

Career statistics

NBA
Source

Regular season

Playoffs

References

1925 births
2021 deaths
American men's basketball players
Basketball players from Chicago
DePaul Blue Demons men's basketball players
Forwards (basketball)
Sheboygan Red Skins players
Undrafted National Basketball Association players
Waterloo Hawks players